Spiridon Ivanovich Putin (19 December 1879 – 19 December 1965) was a Russian chef who was the personal cook of Joseph Stalin and Vladimir Lenin. He was the paternal grandfather of Vladimir Putin.

Early life and education  
Putin was born in Tver Governorate in the Russian Empire. At 12 years old he worked with his cousin at an inn in Tver, and at 15 years old he moved to Saint Petersburg to study cooking.

Career

Early career 
Putin worked at the famous Hotel Astoria, where he once served Grigori Rasputin. Rasputin gave Putin a gold ruble as he was impressed with the cuisine and noticed the similarity between their names.

Career as a chef for Lenin and Stalin 
After the Russian Revolution of 1917, Putin fled to his ancestral home in Tver Governorate. He later returned to Petrograd after which he moved to Moscow.

In Moscow he became Vladimir Lenin's chef. After Lenin's death in 1924, Putin cooked for his widow Nadezhda Krupskaya and her sister until their deaths years later. During this time Putin also cooked occasionally for Joseph Stalin. Putin most likely served in the employ of the NKVD, the secret police predecessor of the KGB. After Krupskaya's death in 1939, Putin worked as chef in a Moscow Communist Party boarding house at Ilyinsky, Moscow Oblast.

Personal life                            
Putin died in 1965. Of his four sons, two died in World War II and Vladimir Putin's father was crippled in combat. Only one son came back from war unscathed.

Death  

Putin continued working as a chef until shortly before his death on his 86th birthday in Moscow, Russian SFSR, Soviet Union.

References

External links 

1879 births
1965 deaths
Chefs from the Russian Empire
Family of Vladimir Putin
People from Tver Governorate
Russian chefs